Peter Chippindale (4 July 1945 – 10 August 2014) was a British newspaper journalist and author. He was born to Keith and Ruth Chippindale in Northern India, where his father was a captain in the 11th Sikh regiment. As a child he attended Sedbergh School

He worked initially for The Guardian newspaper and was sent to Belfast at the height of The Troubles. Chippindale reported on the Birmingham Six trial and that of the Guildford Four and "he thought they'd got the wrong men in both cases". His suspicions convinced Chris Mullin to investigate and led eventually to their acquittal.
 
In 1981 he worked on documentaries for London Weekend Television's The London Programme. He was news editor for the left wing News on Sunday and charted its demise with fellow ex-employee Chris Horrie in their book Disaster: The Rise and Fall of News on Sunday. He also co-wrote Stick It Up Your Punter!,  a history of Rupert Murdoch's The Sun with Horrie.

Bibliography
 Juntas United (1978) with Ed Harriman. Quartet Books. .
 The Thorpe Committal (1979) Arrow Books. .
 The British CB Book (1981)
 Disaster! The Rise And Fall of News On Sunday (1988) with Chris Horrie. Penguin. .
 British Monarchy Plc: An Offer for Sale by Tender (1998) J. Bath. .
 Stick It Up Your Punter! (1990) with Chris Horrie. .
 Dished! (1991) with Suzanne Franks and Roma Felstein. Simon & Schuster.
 Life As Sutch (1991) HarperCollins. .
 Mink! (1995) Pocket Books. .
 Laptop of the Gods (1998) Simon & Schuster. .

References

1945 births
2014 deaths
British male journalists
British writers
People educated at Sedbergh School